Per Steffensen (born 27 February 1963) is a Danish former professional footballer who played as a midfielder.

Honours

Club
Hvidovre IF
 Danish 1st Division: 1981

Brøndby IF
 Danish 1st Division: 1985, 1987, 1988
 Danish League Cup: 1984

References

External links
 

1963 births
Living people
Footballers from Copenhagen
Danish men's footballers
Association football midfielders
Hvidovre IF players
Brøndby IF players
FC Twente players
Ikast FS players
Odense Boldklub players
Danish 1st Division players
Eredivisie players
Danish Superliga players
Danish expatriate men's footballers
Expatriate footballers in the Netherlands
Danish expatriate sportspeople in the Netherlands
Denmark international footballers